Maurice J. "Moxie" Dalton (1896-1957) was a blocking back in the National Football League. He played with the Racine Legion during the 1922 NFL season. He died in 1957 of a heart attack. At the time of his death he worked at an engineering company in Chicago.

References

Sportspeople from Janesville, Wisconsin
Players of American football from Wisconsin
Racine Legion players
American football quarterbacks
Carroll Pioneers football players
Loras Duhawks football players
1896 births
1957 deaths